Jeffry Cliff Petroglyphs (15HA114) are prehistoric petroglyphs created by Native Americans, that lived in the western region of what is now the U.S. state of Kentucky. They are located on and around Jeffry Cliff in Hancock County, although the address is restricted. The petroglyphs cover a roughly  area and are open to public access. These petroglyphs were designated a National Historical Site by the National Park Service on September 8, 1989, and were subsequently assigned the reference number 89001191. The petroglyphs appear to be created for several purposes that include art, religion, and engineering.

References

Petroglyphs in Kentucky
National Historic Sites in Kentucky
National Register of Historic Places in Hancock County, Kentucky
Native American history of Kentucky